Robert Fulton Campiglio (May 17, 1908 – October 22, 1995) was an American football running back in the National Football League for the Staten Island Stapletons and Boston Redskins.  He played college football at West Liberty State College.

See also
 List of NCAA major college football yearly scoring leaders

References

1908 births
1995 deaths
Players of American football from Pennsylvania
American football running backs
Staten Island Stapletons players
Boston Redskins players